Stefano Caselli (born 21 February 1978) is an Italian comic book artist best known for his work on the Marvel Comics title Avengers: The Initiative, the mini-series Civil War: Young Avengers/Runaways and Secret Warriors. He was one of the pencillers of The Amazing Spider-Man, starting with issue #651, and now he is working on Avengers, starting with issue #14 of August 2013.

Bibliography

Marvel Comics
Thunderbolts #70 (with writer Fabian Nicieza; October 2002)
Civil War: Young Avengers/Runaways (with writer Zeb Wells; September - December 2006)
Avengers: The Initiative #1-5, 7-11, 14, 16 (with writers Dan Slott and Christos Gage; June 2007 - October 2008)
Mighty Avengers #18 (with writer Brian Michael Bendis; November 2008)
Dark Reign: New Nation #1 (with writers Brian Michael Bendis and Jonathan Hickman; February 2009)
Secret Warriors #1-6, 11-15 (with writers Brian Michael Bendis and Jonathan Hickman; April 2009 - June 2010)
The Amazing Spider-Man #651-654, 654.1, 657, 659-660, 666, 673, 682-683, 686-687 (with writer Dan Slott; February 2011 – August 2012)
Venom #9 (with writer Rick Remender; January 2012)
Avengers Assemble #9-11 (with writer Kelly Sue DeConnick, January - March 2013)
A+X #6 (with writer Mike Costa, May 2013)
Avengers #14-16, 36, 38, 40, 42-44 (with writers Jonathan Hickman and Nick Spencer, August 2013 – April 2015)
Avengers World #1-5, 7, 9 (with writers Jonathan Hickman and Nick Spencer, January–August 2014)
All-New Inhumans #1-11 (with writers James Asmus and Charles Soule, December 2015-September 2016)
Invincible Iron Man Iron Heart, Volume 3 #1-11 (with writer Brian Michael Bendis, November 2016 - September 2017)
Invincible Iron Man, #593-600 (with writer Brian Michael Bendis, October 2017-May 2018)
West Coast Avengers #1-4 (with writer Kelly Thompson, August 2018 – November 2018)

Devil's Due Publishing
Hack/Slash #1 (with writer Tim Seeley; April 2004)
G.I. Joe: Master & Apprentice #1-4 (with writer Brandon Jerwa; May - August 2004)
Defex #1, 3-4 (with writer Marv Wolfman; October 2004 - February 2005)
G.I. Joe: America's Elite #0-9, 11, 13 (with writer Joe Casey; June 2005 - July 2006)
Hack/Slash: The Series #6 (with writer Tim Seeley; November 2007)

Other
Vampirella #22 (with writer Dan Jolley, Harris Publications; August 2003)
Micronauts #6-7 (with writer Dan Jolley, Image Comics; March - April 2003)

References

External links

Living people
Artists from Rome
1978 births
Italian comics artists